The Duncan MacMillan Nursing Home (DMNH) was a 25-bed nursing home in Sheet Harbour, Nova Scotia Canada. It was built in 1948 as the Eastern Shore Memorial Hospital, and was repurposed into a nursing home after a new wing, which would become the Eastern Shore Memorial Hospital, was built in 1983. It was replaced by Harbourview Lodge in 2010, and was demolished.

History
DMNH was named after a local well-known doctor, Dr. Duncan MacMillan. The building that was used as DMNH from 1983–2010 was originally built in 1948, and used as Eastern Shore Memorial Hospital. It was converted into a Nursing Home in 1983 after a new wing was built and made into the Eastern Shore Memorial Hospital.

In December 2005, negotiations between DMNH and the union representing DMNH staff broke down, leading to the threat of a strike over the Christmas holiday. A negotiated agreement was reached in early January 2006.

The Nova Scotia Department of Health announced plans in 2007 to build a replacement nursing home for Sheet Harbour in 2010.

References

Nursing homes in Canada
Demolished buildings and structures in Canada
Buildings and structures demolished in 2010